Tarzan Alive: A Definitive Biography of Lord Greystoke is a fictional biography by American author Philip José Farmer, that alleges the life of Edgar Rice Burroughs' character Tarzan, is a story of a real person. The book was first published in hardcover by Doubleday in 1972, with a paperback edition following from Popular Library in 1973 and a trade paperback edition from Bison Books in 2006. The first British edition was published by Panther in 1974.

The book is written on the premise that Tarzan was an actual person with original author Burroughs having written highly fictionalized and romanticized memoirs of Tarzan, which were based on Tarzan's own life stories and adventures.  Farmer is then telling the "real story". Farmer examines the psychological make up of John Clayton (Tarzan's real name in the novels) and his peers, based on close readings of the various Burroughs books, accepting some of Burroughs' concepts and rejecting others in an attempt at greater verisimilitude. Among his conceits is that, since the apes described by Burroughs had a spoken language that Tarzan learned, these animals must have been "pithecanthropoids": "a group of rare hominids who are probably now extinct" and "not great apes".

The most recent edition of Tarzan Alive includes a foreword by Win Scott Eckert and an introduction by Mike Resnick along with "An Exclusive Interview with Lord Greystoke" and "Extracts from the Memoirs of "Lord Greystoke".  

The text of Tarzan Alive links the characters from the Tarzan mythos to dozens of other fictional literary characters as members of Farmer's "Wold Newton family".

See also

Philip José Farmer bibliography, for other Tarzan-related Farmer works
Doc Savage: His Apocalyptic Life (1973), another Farmer "fictional biography"

External links
 Google Books preview:   
Summary of Tarzan Alive 
An Expansion of Philip José Farmer's Wold Newton Universe

1972 American novels
1972 fantasy novels
Wold Newton family
Novels by Philip José Farmer
Works based on Tarzan
Crossover novels